The 2004 Chrono des Herbiers was the 23rd edition of the Chrono des Nations cycle race and was held on 17 October 2004. The race started and finished in Les Herbiers. The race was won by Bert Roesems.

General classification

References

2004
2004 in road cycling
2004 in French sport
October 2004 sports events in France